Kiichi Hōgen (jp. 鬼一法眼) is a legendary Japanese monk and warrior from the 1100s who appeared in "Gikeiki" (a military epic about the life of Minamoto no Yoshitsune) written in the early Muromachi period. Hōgen is a honorific title for a monk, not a name, with Kiichi Hōgen literally meaning "Priest the First Demon".

He was an onmyoji who resided at  Horikawa-dori in Heian-kyō (Kyoto), and was an authority on the magical art of warfare called Rikuto-heiho. It is believed that he excelled both in academics and military art. He is well-known for the legend that Yoshitsune stole his family heirloom military book Rikuto in collaboration with his daughter, Mizuru-hime. Due to his legendary status, he is sometimes identified with Kurama Tengu, also a sage (a tengu instead of a human) of Mount Kurama credited in some versions with teaching young Minamoto-no-Yoshitsune swordsmanship, tactics, and magic.

His teachings, often taken from Rikuto (such as the quote If it comes meet it, if it leaves, send it on its way, if it opposes then unify it. 5 and 5 are 10, 1 and 9 are 10, 2 and 8 are 10. The large suppresses all, the small enters the microscopic. The power of life and death) continued to influence further martial arts, eg. with Hōgen being credited by Morihei Ueshiba, founder of aikido.

He is a main character of a jidaimono Kiichi Hōgen sanryaku no maki, written in 1731 by Hasegawa Senshi(長谷川千四) and Matsuda Bunkōdō (和田文耕堂) for the Takemoto-za. The play had originally 5 acts, but only two main parts have survived: "Kikubatake" ("The Chrysanthemum Garden"), the main scene of the 3rd act, and "Ichijō  Ōkura Monogatari", the core of the 4th act. The final act, "Gojō no Hashi" is rarely played on stage.

In Sakyō-ku, Kyoto, next to Kurama Elementary School in Kuramahonmachi, there is a stone monument 'Kiichi Hōgen historic site' which is said to be the site of Kiichi Hōgen's mansion and tomb. It was erected on November 10, 1918 by Kurama school staff. 

In addition, there is a shrine Kiichihōgensha, in the precincts of Kurama-dera, visited often by people wishing for improvement in the martial arts.

References

See also 
 Oshizamurai Kiichihōgan

Onmyōji
Japanese swordfighters
People of Heian-period Japan
Deified Japanese people
Japanese legends